Saint Luke Painting the Virgin is a 1650-1655 painting by Luca Giordano, now in the Musée des Beaux-Arts de Lyon. It shows Saint Luke painting the Virgin. Another work on the same subject by the same artist is now in the Museo de Arte in Ponce, Puerto Rico.

Sources
François Artaud, Notice des tableaux du musée de la Ville de Lyon, 1832, p. 27

Paintings by Luca Giordano
Giordano
1650s paintings
Paintings in the collection of the Museum of Fine Arts of Lyon
Giordano
Angels in art
Paintings about painting